Melby Windmill (Danish.

History
The windmill was built in 1878 for Hans Petersen, a sailor born in 1846 at Sjællands Odde. He operated it and a bakery until 1907. It has later been used as a sawmill. It was taken out of service in 1946 after the tailpole had been destroyed in a storm.

Description
The windmill consists of an octagonal tower clad in shingles and topped by an ogee cap. The cap carries the four Common sails. It is winded by a tailpole. The mill stands on a stone case, which has an underpass for wagons.

Today
The windmill is owned by Halsnæs Municipality. It has been restored, but not to working order. It is open to visitors. A key can be obtained in one of the neighbouring houses.

See also
 List of windmills in Denmark
 Ramløse Windmill
 Hørsholm Windmill

References

External links

Buildings and structures in Halsnæs Municipality
Smock mills in Denmark
Windmills completed in 1878